John Stephen Pazak, C.Ss.R. (born August 13, 1946 in Gary, Indiana) is an American-born member of the Congregation of the Most Holy Redeemer, commonly known as the Redemptorists, who served as an eparch of the Ruthenian Greek Catholic Church.  He served as the Eparch of the Ruthenian Catholic Eparchy of the Holy Protection of Mary, which is based in Phoenix, Arizona from July 2016 until his retirement in 2021.

Life

Family
Pazak was born in Gary, Indiana, on August 13, 1946, to Stephen Pazak, an American of Ruthenian descent, and Johanna Hennessy, who was of Irish descent, both members of the Ruthenian Greek Catholic Church.

Religious life
Pazak was admitted to the novitiate of the Canadian Province of the Redemptorists at Yorkton, Saskatchewan, on September 14, 1965. He studied at the Redemptorist seminary, St. Alphonsus College, in Suffield, Connecticut, and earned a bachelor's degree there in 1969. He made his perpetual profession of religious vows as a member of the Congregation on August 24 of that same year.  After completing a baccalaureate in theology at Saint Paul University in Ottawa, he was ordained a priest on August 27, 1972.

After serving in a Saskatoon parish for a year, Pazak was appointed Rector of Saint Vladimir's College in Manitoba, and continued in this position until 1990, except during 1978–1979, when he served as superior at the Redemptorist scholasticate in Toronto.  From 1990 1996, he was pastor at Ss. Peter and Paul Ukrainian Catholic Church in Saskatoon, then from 1996 to 2000 he was parish priest at St. Joseph Church in Winnipeg.

Pazak also served as vicar of his Redemptorist province, as a member of the provincial council, and as a consultor to the Ukrainian Catholic Eparchy of Saskatoon.

Eparchial appointments
Pope John Paul II appointed Pazak eparch of the Slovak Catholic Eparchy of Saints Cyril and Methodius of Toronto on December 2, 2000.  The Ukrainian Catholic Archbishop of Winnipeg, Michael Bzdel, C.Ss.R., consecrated him a bishop on February 14, 2001; the co-consecrators were Milan Chautur, C.Ss.R., Apostolic Exarch of Košice and Basil Schott, O.F.M., the Ruthenian Eparch of Parma.

Pope Francis named Pazak the Eparch of the Ruthenian Catholic Eparchy of the Holy Protection of Mary in Phoenix on May 7, 2016. On the same day he was appointed Apostolic Administrator of the Eparchy of Saints Cyril and Methodius of Toronto, until the appointment of a successor.  He was enthroned as Eparch of Phoenix for the Ruthenians on July 20, 2016. On August 23, 2021, Pope Francis accepted his resignation after reaching the  age of 75.

See also
 

 Catholic Church hierarchy
 Catholic Church in the United States
 Historical list of the Catholic bishops of the United States
 List of Catholic bishops of the United States
 Lists of patriarchs, archbishops, and bishops

References

External links
Ruthenian Catholic Eparchy of Phoenix Official Site

Episcopal succession

 

1946 births
Living people
People from Gary, Indiana
Redemptorist bishops
Slovak Greek Catholic bishops
Ruthenian Catholic bishops
American Eastern Catholic bishops
Canadian Eastern Catholic bishops
American people of Rusyn descent
American people of Irish descent
21st-century Eastern Catholic bishops
21st-century American clergy